Solomon Ortiz Jr. (born July 21, 1977) is a Democratic former member of the Texas House of Representatives, serving from 2006 to 2011. Ortiz is the son of former Congressman Solomon Ortiz, who represented a South Texas district for 28 years before being defeated by Republican Blake Farenthold in 2010. Ortiz Jr. considered challenging Farenthold in 2014. Ortiz currently is Executive Director for the MAP of Texas, a non-profit founded by him and his father. Solomon is also a Partner in Ortiz Holdings, a business development firm based in Texas, and has previously worked as a public school teacher and for the Fighting to Rid Gangs in America Foundation.

Ortiz was elected in 2006, succeeding fellow Democrat Vilma Luna. Ortiz was unseated in 2010 by Raul Torres, a businessman who Ortiz had defeated in 2008. Ortiz announced a comeback bid for the 2012 elections, but ultimately did not run.

References

External links
 
Twitter account

American politicians of Mexican descent
Living people
Democratic Party members of the Texas House of Representatives
Hispanic and Latino American state legislators in Texas
People from Corpus Christi, Texas
Texas A&M University alumni
1977 births
21st-century American politicians